Frederick Barbarossa Memorial is a monument dedicated to Holy Roman Emperor Frederick I located in Mersin Province, southern Turkey.

Location
It overlooks the Göksu River and Ekşiler village on the other side of the river.

History
Holy Roman Emperor Frederick I Barbarossa (reigned 1155–1190) participated in the Third Crusade (1189–1192). After having left much of Anatolia behind, he drowned on 10 June 1190 in the Saleph River, what is Göksu River today. While crossing the river, his horse slipped and threw him against the rocks.

Memorial
An inscription was placed close to the point of Frederick's demise by the Embassy of Federal Republic of Germany in 1971. However, when the highway was widened by the General Directorate of Highways, a larger monument with a larger than life statue of the emperor was inaugurated at the present place on 11 May 2012. The new location was determined by the German ambassador Prof. Pascal Hector. The bilingual (German and Turkish) inscription is identical to that of 1971 and reads:

Holy Roman-German Emperor Frederick Barbarossa, who was in friendly agreement with the Seljukid Sultan Kılıçarslan II for a free passage, drowned in Göksu River around this place while going to Palestine with his army. 
 
The text, although not in perfect accord with the historical fact, conveys a peaceful message.
 
The statue disappeared a year after the inauguration. Only the base of the monument is left.

Suggestions
According to local historian Dr. Mustafa Erim, Silifke citizens ask for a statue of Kılıçarslan II, who was the Seljukid sultan in 1190, next to that of Frederick Barbarossa.

Notes

References

Monuments and memorials in Turkey
Buildings and structures completed in 2012
Buildings and structures in Mersin Province
Inscriptions
Silifke District
Frederick I, Holy Roman Emperor
21st-century architecture in Turkey